The list of awards and nominations received by Dev during her career. She has won 3 awards from 16 nominations.

Awards Received by Dev

4 Music Awards

Billboard Music Awards

BMI Pop Music Awards

Brit Awards

International Dance Music Awards

|-
| 2011
| "Like a G6"
| Best Rap/Hip-Hop Dance Track 
|

MP3 Music Awards

mtvU Woodie Awards

MTV Video Music Awards Japan

MuchMusic Video Awards

Rockbjörnen Awards

References

Dev